The al-Buraq Mosque is a subterranean mosque next to the Western Wall, located in the southwest corner of the Masjid al-Aqsa compound in the Old City of Jerusalem. This mosque is called al-Buraq Mosque because of a ring that is nailed to its wall where Muslims believe Muhammad tied the Buraq that carried him from the al-Haram Mosque to the al-Aqsa Mosque during the Night Journey.

History 
The mosque is located inside the vaulted passage that once led to Barclay's Gate, which is at the south end of the Western Wall. The inside of the gate, which served as an entrance to the compound during the early Islamic period, is currently known as al-Buraq Mosque. The entrance to the underground structure faces north and immediately left of the Moors' Gate (Bāb al-Magharibah).

Temple Mount traditionalists identify Barclay's Gate with the Kiponus Gate, mentioned as the western gate of the outer court in the Mishnah (Middot 3:1). They also suppose that the Kiponus Gate was named after Coponius (AD 6-9), a Roman procurator, thus one of the four gates described by Josephus.

Architecture 
According to Barclay's and his followers' archeological researches, the gate measures 5.06 metres in width and 8.80 metres in height of the doorway, which provides insight into the dimensions of the mosque. According to archeological sites, this gate was used as an entrance to the Temple Mount during the Umayyad period, in connection with structural features, such as the chamfered edge: a distinctive feature of all Umayyad gates in the vicinity, such as the Golden Gate and the Double Gate. A sign outside the mosque indicates that it dates back to the Mamluk period. Overall, the gate passage was in use until some time after AD 985, when it was blocked and changed into a cistern adjacent to al-Buraq Mosque. Even though the main gate of al-Buraq Mosque located in the Western Wall is permanently sealed, the mosque is still accessible for worship from another entrance in the Temple Mount's western portico (riwāq).

Gallery

References

Mosques in Jerusalem